Shin Jin-seo (born 17 March 2000) is a South Korean professional Go player. He has won four major international championships: the LG Cup in 2020 and 2022, the Chunlan Cup in 2021, and the Samsung Cup in 2022. As of November 2022, he is the number one ranked Korean player in the Korea Baduk Association's official rankings, a spot which he first reached in November 2018 and has held continuously since January 2020.

Career
Shin Jin-seo turned pro in July 2012. In January 2013, he defeated Lee Chang-ho (9 dan) in a young players vs legends exhibition match. Shin was promoted to 2 dan in November 2013.

He won the Let's Run Park Cup and the Shinin-Wang title, both in 2015. In 2017, he won the Globis Cup and won the Korean Baduk League with his team, Team Jungkwangjang. He won the 31st Asian TV Cup, defeating Ding Hao in June 2019.

In January 2019, Shin was defeated by South Korean Go program HanDol. The program defeated the top five South Korean go players. HanDol has been compared to AlphaGo, but is considered to be weaker.

Shin reached 9 dan in 2018.

In 2020, he defeated Park Junghwan at the LG Cup.

He won the 13th Chunlan Cup in 2021, his second major international title, with a 2–0 victory over Tang Weixing in the finals. In 2022, he defeated Yang Dingxin 2–0 to win the LG Cup for the second time. He also won the 2022 Samsung Cup after finishing as the runner-up the two previous years.

International competitions 

(W) Winner; (RU) Runner-up; (SF) Semifinalist; (QF) Quarterfinalist; (R16) Round of 16; (R32) Round of 32; (R64) Round of 64.

References

External links 
 Shin Jin-seo at Sensei's Library
 Shin Jin-seo on Go Ratings
 Korea Baduk Association profile (in Korean)

2000 births
Living people
South Korean Go players
Sportspeople from Busan